Jece Valadão, pseudonym of Gecy Valadão (July 24, 1930 – November 27, 2006), was a Brazilian actor, director and producer. He became known by his  cafajeste (a womanizing, roguish crook) roles in films such as Rio 40 graus (1955) and Os Cafajestes (1962).

Career
Born in Campos dos Goytacazes in the interior of Rio de Janeiro, he was raised in Cachoeiro de Itapemirim in Espírito Santo, due to the transfer of his father, a railroader, to the city. He moved to Rio de Janeiro alone, where he began his theatrical studies, thus forming himself as an actor, acting in cinema, stage and television.  In addition to acting in more than one hundred films, he also specialized as a director and producer. In the 1970s, he was an actor and, mainly, a producer of comedies and erotic police films.  One of his last appearances on television was in the HBO Latin America series Filhos do Carnaval.

Personal life
Valadão was married six times, the last one to actress Vera Gimenez from 1974 until his death in 2006. From this marriage he had a son: actor Marco Antônio Gimenez (b.1981) The artist was also the stepfather of television presenter Luciana Gimenez. Valadão had a total of nine children from previous relationships. In 1995, he was converted to Protestantism, even becoming pastor of a Assembly of God church.

On November 21, 2006, Jece Valadão felt ill and was admitted to the ICU of the Panamericano Hospital, in São Paulo, and at 5:20 pm on November 27, he died due to respiratory failure.  He was buried in Jardim da Saudade Cemitério Parque, in the city of Cachoeiro de Itapemirim.

Filmography 
Film

2007 - Encarnação do Demônio
2006 - 5 Frações de uma Quase História
2003 - Garrincha, estrela solitária
1997 - O cangaceiro
1996 - Tieta do agreste
1984 - Águia na cabeça
1981 - O torturador
1981 - A Idade da Terra
1979 - Eu matei Lúcio Flávio
1978 - O Gigante da América
1977 - Quem matou Pacífico?
1976 - A nudez de Alexandra
1976 - Ninguém segura essas mulheres
1976 - A noite dos assassinos
1976 - O homem de papel
1975 - Nós, Os Canalhas
1974 - O mau caráter
1973 - Tercer Mundo
1973 - Um edifício chamado 200
1973 - A Filha de Madame Betina
1973 - Obsessão
1972 - Ali Babá e os Quarenta Ladrões
1972 - A difícil vida fácil
1971 - O enterro da cafetina
1970 - Memórias de um gigolô
1969 - O matador profissional
1969 - A navalha na carne
1969 - Quelé do Pajeú
1969 - Os raptores
1968 - As sete faces de um cafajeste
1967 - A espiã que entrou em fria
1967 - Mineirinho vivo ou morto
1967 - A lei do cão
1966 - Paraíba, vida e morte de um bandido
1965 - História de um crápula
1965 - 22-2000 Cidade Aberta
1964 - Asfalto selvagem
1963 - Boca de ouro
1963 - Bonitinha mas ordinária
1962 - Os cafajestes
1961 - Mulheres e milhões
1960 - Favela
1960 - Tudo Legal
1959 - Mulher de fogo
1957 - Garotas e Samba
1957 - Rio Zona Norte
1955 - Rio, 40 graus
1955 - Almas em conflito
1954 - Carnaval em Caxias
1952 - Barnabé tu és meu
1952 - Amei um bicheiro
1952 - Três vagabundos
1949 - Também somos irmãos
1949 - Carnaval no fogo

Television 

 1959 - Trágica Mentira - (TV Tupi)
 1964 - O Desconhecido
 1965 - 22-2000 Cidade Aberta
 1970 - Pigmalião 70
 1972 - Tempo de viver (1972)
 1979 - Os Trapalhões
 1984 - Transas e Caretas
 1986 - Anos Dourados
 1988 - Olho por Olho
 1990 - Pantanal
 1991 - O Fantasma da Ópera
 1991 - O Dono do Mundo
 1993 - Contos de Verão
 1994 - Memorial de Maria Moura
 1996 - A vida como ela é
 2000, 1994, 1992 - Você decide
 2005 - Bang Bang
 2006 - Cidadão Brasileiro
 2006 - Filhos do Carnaval

References 

Assemblies of God people
Converts to Protestantism
Brazilian people of Portuguese descent
Actors from Rio de Janeiro (state)
2006 deaths
1930 births